is a Sapporo Municipal Subway station in Atsubetsu-ku, Sapporo, Hokkaido, Japan. The station is numbered T17.

The station is the closest to Sapporo Atsubetsu Park Stadium, home to Consadole Sapporo.

Platforms

Surrounding area
 Hokusei Gakuen University
 National Route 12 (to Asahikawa)
 Sapporo Atsubetsu Park Stadium, 20 minutes' walk from the station
 Sapporo Ryūtsū Center (Axes Sapporo)
 Sapporo City Transportation Bureau, main Office
 Ōyachi Higashi Post Office
 Capo Oyachi, shopping center
 Sapporo Kita Hiroshima Cycling road
 Ōyachi Hospital
 North Pacific Bank, Ōyachi branch
 Hokkaido Bank, Ōyachi branch

External links

 Sapporo Subway Stations

 

Railway stations in Japan opened in 1982
Railway stations in Sapporo
Sapporo Municipal Subway